Jotsoma is an Angami Naga village  located about  west from the state capital, Kohima. The total population of the village is about 2,458. Kohima Science College, Doordharshan Kendra Kohima, Water Supply Reservoir (Public Health Engineering), Sazolie College and Regional Centre of Excellence for Music & Performing Arts (RCEMPA) are located on the hill top of Jotsoma village.

References

Villages in Kohima district